Lawrence Craig Evans (born November 1, 1949) is an American mathematician and Professor of Mathematics at the University of California, Berkeley.

His research is in the field of nonlinear partial differential equations, primarily elliptic equations. Evans also made significant contributions to the development of the theory of viscosity solutions of nonlinear equations, to the understanding of the Hamilton–Jacobi–Bellman equation arising in stochastic optimal control theory, and to the theory of harmonic maps. He is also well known as the author of the textbook Partial Differential Equations, which is considered as a standard introduction to the theory at the graduate level. His textbook Measure theory and fine properties of functions (coauthored with Ronald Gariepy), an exposition on Hausdorff measure, capacity, Sobolev functions, and sets of finite perimeter, is also widely cited.

Evans is an ISI highly cited researcher.

Biography
Lawrence Evans was born November 1, 1949 in Atlanta, Georgia. He received a BA from Vanderbilt University in 1971 and a PhD, with thesis advisor Michael G. Crandall, from the University of California, Los Angeles in 1975. From 1975 to 1980, he worked at the University of Kentucky; from 1980 to 1989, at the University of Maryland; and since 1989, at the University of California, Berkeley.

Awards
 2023 - Steele Prize for Mathematical Exposition
 2014 - National Academy of Sciences
 2013 - AMS Fellow 
 2004 - Steele Prize for Seminal Contribution to Research, with Nikolay V. Krylov
 2003 - American Academy of Arts and Sciences
 1979 - Sloan Fellow

Major publications
 Evans, Lawrence C. Classical solutions of fully nonlinear, convex, second-order elliptic equations. Comm. Pure Appl. Math. 35 (1982), no. 3, 333–363.
 Crandall, M.G.; Evans, L.C.; Lions, P.-L. Some properties of viscosity solutions of Hamilton-Jacobi equations. Trans. Amer. Math. Soc. 282 (1984), no. 2, 487–502.
 Evans, L.C.; Souganidis, P.E. Differential games and representation formulas for solutions of Hamilton-Jacobi-Isaacs equations. Indiana Univ. Math. J. 33 (1984), no. 5, 773–797.
 Evans, Lawrence C. Quasiconvexity and partial regularity in the calculus of variations. Arch. Rational Mech. Anal. 95 (1986), no. 3, 227–252.
 Evans, Lawrence C. The perturbed test function method for viscosity solutions of nonlinear PDE. Proc. Roy. Soc. Edinburgh Sect. A 111 (1989), no. 3-4, 359–375.
 Evans, Lawrence C. Partial regularity for stationary harmonic maps into spheres. Arch. Rational Mech. Anal. 116 (1991), no. 2, 101–113.
 Evans, L.C.; Spruck, J. Motion of level sets by mean curvature. I. J. Differential Geom. 33 (1991), no. 3, 635–681.
 Evans, Lawrence C. Periodic homogenisation of certain fully nonlinear partial differential equations. Proc. Roy. Soc. Edinburgh Sect. A 120 (1992), no. 3-4, 245–265.
 Evans, L.C.; Soner, H.M.; Souganidis, P.E. Phase transitions and generalized motion by mean curvature. Comm. Pure Appl. Math. 45 (1992), no. 9, 1097–1123.
 Evans, Lawrence C. Partial differential equations and Monge-Kantorovich mass transfer. Current developments in mathematics, 1997 (Cambridge, MA), 65–126, Int. Press, Boston, MA, 1999. 
 Crandall, M.G.; Evans, L.C.; Gariepy, R.F. Optimal Lipschitz extensions and the infinity Laplacian. Calc. Var. Partial Differential Equations 13 (2001), no. 2, 123–139.

Books
 Evans, Lawrence C. Weak convergence methods for nonlinear partial differential equations. CBMS Regional Conference Series in Mathematics, 74. Published for the Conference Board of the Mathematical Sciences, Washington, DC; by the American Mathematical Society, Providence, RI, 1990. viii+80 pp. 
 Evans, L.C.; Gangbo, W. Differential equations methods for the Monge-Kantorovich mass transfer problem. Mem. Amer. Math. Soc. 137 (1999), no. 653, viii+66 pp.
 Calculus of Variations and Non-Linear Partial Differential Equations (with Michael Grain Crandall, Nicola Fusco, Luis Caffarelli, Lawrence C. Evans), Lectures given at the C.I.M.E. Summer School held in Cetraro, Italy, June 27-July 2, 2005, LNM Series No. 1917, Bernard Dacorogna and Paolo Marcellini Editors, Springer-Verlag, Berlin & Heidelberg (DE), 2007. 
 Evans, Lawrence C. Partial differential equations. Second edition. Graduate Studies in Mathematics, 19. American Mathematical Society, Providence, RI, 2010. xxii+749 pp. 
 Evans, Lawrence C.; Gariepy, Ronald F. Measure theory and fine properties of functions. Revised edition. Textbooks in Mathematics. CRC Press, Boca Raton, FL, 2015. xiv+299 pp.

References

External links
 Evans' profile, Berkeley.edu; accessed June 7, 2014
 Evans' recent papers
 

1949 births
Living people
University of California, Riverside faculty
20th-century American mathematicians
21st-century American mathematicians
Fellows of the American Mathematical Society
Members of the United States National Academy of Sciences
Place of birth missing (living people)
PDE theorists